Sharon E. Clahchischilliage (Navajo Nation) (born 1947 or 1948) is an American politician and a Republican member of the New Mexico House of Representatives, representing District 4 from 2013-2018, and District 5 beginning in 2022.

Early life and education
Clahchischilliage was born into a Navajo family, the daughter of Eleanor and Herb Clah in Farmington, New Mexico, and is a member of the Navajo Nation. Clahchischilliage attended the University of New Mexico, earned her BS in education from Eastern New Mexico University, and earned her MA in social work from the University of Pennsylvania.

Career
Clahchischilliage has had a variety of teaching and psychiatric social work experience, including as a special education teacher. Working on Indian and tribal health issues, including as Lieutenant, Commissioned Corps Officer, United States Public Health Service and for the Indian Health Service, Clahchischilliage became involved in large programs.

She entered politics when appointed as Tribal Affairs Officer, Children, Youth and Families (CYFD), Office of the Cabinet Secretary, The State of New Mexico. She has also served in top positions in the Navajo Nation (the largest federally-recognized tribe in the United States) as Acting Executive Director, Office of Government Development, Office of the Speaker, The Navajo Nation, 2010–present; and as Senior Programs/Projects Specialist, Division of Transportation, Navajo Nation. Her district includes part of West Albuquerque, New Mexico.

Personal life 
She is married and has five children.

Elections
2012 To challenge District 4 incumbent Democratic Representative Ray Begaye, Clahchischilliage ran unopposed for the June 5, 2012 Republican Primary, winning with 958 votes and won the November 6, 2012 General election with 5,856 votes (61.4%) against Representative Begaye.
2002 To challenge incumbent Democratic Secretary of State of New Mexico Rebecca Vigil-Giron, Clahchischilliage was unopposed for the 2002 Republican Primary but lost the November 5, 2002 General election to Secretary Vigil-Giron.

References

External links
 Official page, New Mexico Legislature
 Campaign site
 
 Sharon E. Clahchischilliage, Ballotpedia
 Sharon E. Clahchischilliage, National Institute on Money in State Politics

21st-century American politicians
21st-century American women politicians
Schoolteachers from New Mexico
American women educators
Eastern New Mexico University alumni
Living people
Members of the Navajo Nation Council
Republican Party members of the New Mexico House of Representatives
Native American state legislators in New Mexico
Native American women in politics
People from Farmington, New Mexico
Place of birth missing (living people)
University of New Mexico alumni
University of Pennsylvania School of Social Policy and Practice alumni
Women state legislators in New Mexico
1940s births
People from San Juan County, New Mexico
21st-century Native Americans
21st-century Native American women
Candidates in the 2002 United States elections